The Smithsonian's Museum Conservation Institute (MCI) aims to be the center for specialized conservation and technical collection research for all of the Smithsonian museums and collections. MCI's staff combine state-of-the-art instrumentation and scientific techniques with the knowledge of materials and the history of technology to provide technical research studies and interpretation of art, as well as historical and anthropological objects, to improve the conservation and collections storage capabilities at the Smithsonian. For the majority of the Smithsonian collections, MCI is the only Smithsonian resource for technical studies and analyses.

History

The Smithsonian's Board of Regents established the Conservation Research Laboratory of the United States National Museum in 1963 in response to a growing need to support conservation of the entire Institution's collections.

In 1965 the name of the laboratory was changed to the Conservation Analytical Laboratory (CAL). In 1983, the laboratory moved to the Museum Support Center in Suitland, Maryland. Congress mandated a national conservation training program among other wider responsibilities including an expanded conservation science research program.

The Board of Regents approved a name change to the Smithsonian Center for Materials Research and Education (SCMRE) in 1998. SCMRE's mission was to serve all museum communities - national and international, and provide professional training and education programs.

In 2006 the Board of Regents approved the name change to the Museum Conservation Institute (MCI).

Directors
Robert J. Koestler, 2004-

Lambertus van Zelst, 1984–2003

Robert M. Organ, 1967–1983

Charles H. Olin, 1966–1967

Facilities

MCI's laboratories are equipped with advanced analytical instrumentation, including:

 isotope ratio (or stable isotope) mass spectrometry
 inductively coupled plasma mass spectrometry
 Fourier transform infrared spectrometry
 Raman spectrometry, including Fourier transform Raman and portable Raman spectroscopy
 gas chromatography
 pyrolysis-gas chromatography-mass spectrometry
 optical microscopy
 proteomics 
 scanning electron microscopy with X-ray and energy dispersive fluorescence
 X-ray radiography
 ultraviolet-visible light spectrophotometry
 structured 3-D color scanning of objects

The Smithsonian's Museum Conservation Institute and the Institut Photonique d’Analyse Non-destructive Européen des Matériaux Anciens platform at Soleil have formed a partnership to use the power of the third-generation synchrotron to study and preserve the priceless Smithsonian collections.

Further reading
Charola, A. Elena, and Robert J. Koestler, eds. Pesticide Mitigation in Museum Collections: Science in Conservation: Proceedings from the MCI Workshop Series. Smithsonian Contributions to Museum Conservation, no. 1. Washington, D.C.: Smithsonian Institution Scholarly Press, 2010. Copies of this volume are available for free pdf download by clicking on the included link.
Charola, A. Elena, Christopher McNamara, and Robert J. Koestler, eds.  Biocolonization of Stone: Control and Preventive Methods: Proceedings from the MCI Workshop Series. Smithsonian Contributions to Museum Conservation, no. 2. Washington, DC: Smithsonian Institution Scholarly Press, 2011. Copies of this volume are available for free pdf download by clicking on the included link.

References

External links
 Museum Conservation Institute Official Museum Conservation Institute web site.
 Smithsonian Research Online Smithsonian Research Bibliography and Smithsonian Digital Repository.

Museum organizations
Smithsonian Institution research programs
Conservation and restoration organizations
1963 establishments in Maryland
Research institutes in Maryland